Dennis McCauley (born August 15, 1985) is an American former professional ice hockey player. He played in the American Hockey League for the Worcester Sharks and Portland Pirates, and also spent three seasons playing in European hockey leagues.

McCauley completed his four-year college career at Northeastern University, recording 45 points (22 goals, 23 assists) in 129 games while recording 266 penalty minutes. On October 6, 2009, McCauley signed a one-year contract with the Worcester Sharks. In 45 games with Worcester, he recorded 10 goals and four assists for 14 points.

On July 30, 2010, McCauley was signed as a free agent by the Buffalo Sabres. He spent the entire 2010–11 season with their AHL affiliate, the Portland Pirates, posting 33 points (12 goals, 21 assists) in 73 games.

After a productive season with the Pirates, McCauley became an unrestricted free agent. On October 4, 2011, he signed a one-year contract with the Reading Royals of the ECHL.

McCauley finished his professional career during the 2014–15 season with Cracovia Krakow, a team based in Poland.

References

External links

1985 births
American men's ice hockey forwards
Living people
Portland Pirates players
People from Billerica, Massachusetts
Ice hockey players from Massachusetts
Sportspeople from Middlesex County, Massachusetts